The General Assembly were a music video and commercial directing duo based in Los Angeles, CA. They directed music videos for such artists as A.C. Newman, Grum, The Wombats, Totally Enormous Extinct Dinosaurs, Jason Lytle, Fruit Bats (band) and Radar Bros. They also directed commercials for Jameson Irish Whiskey, O2 (UK), George Dickel, BT Group, Jeremiah Weed, Blinkbox, Diageo and BBC Radio 1.

In June 2010, their video for Jason Lytle's "I Am Lost (And The Moment Cannot Last)" was featured in the Los Angeles Film Festival. In June 2011, TGA was included in the prestigious Saatchi & Saatchi New Directors Showcase at the Cannes Lions International Festival of Creativity. Also in 2011, they won the Audience Award at the Los Angeles Film Festival for their music video of Grum's "Can't Shake This Feeling."

TGA fully disbanded as of 2014 with Adam Littke and Adam Willis now directing independently.

Music videos

Commercials

Sources 
 
 
 

American music video directors